Gaston Gerosa (15 August 1923 – 24 December 2002) was a Swiss cyclist. He competed in the team pursuit event at the 1948 Summer Olympics.

References

1923 births
2002 deaths
Swiss male cyclists
Olympic cyclists of Switzerland
Cyclists at the 1948 Summer Olympics
Cyclists from Zürich